The London Borough of Sutton, one of the peripheral London boroughs, has 89  parks and open spaces within its boundaries, a total area of 1500 acres (6 km2). Varied in size and layout, green spaces range from the compact Manor Park in Sutton town centre, through the medium-sized Grove Park, which forms part of the Carshalton Village conservation area, to the large and historic Oaks Park in the south of the borough. In the west of the borough is the large Nonsuch Park. The main parks are:
 Beddington Park
 Benhill Recreation Ground
 Carshalton Park
 Cheam Park
 Collingwood Recreation Ground
 Corrigan Avenue Recreation Ground, Coulsdon
 Grove Park, Carshalton
 Lakeside
 Manor Park, Sutton town centre
 Nonsuch Park
 Oaks Park, Carshalton
 Overton Park
 Mellows Park
 Poulter Park
 Queen Mary's Park 
 Reigate Avenue Playing Fields (known locally as The Daisy Field)
 Roundshaw Downs
 Rosehill Park East (including Greenshaw Woods) and West
 Royston Park
 Seears Park 
 St Helier Open Space 
 Sutton Common Park
 Sutton Green
 The Wandle Walkway
 The Wrythe Recreation Ground
 Thomas Wall Park

References

External links
Notes on Sutton's parks
Sutton Council's Page on Parks and Recreation Grounds
Walking Map of Sutton's Parks